Christopher Idle may refer to:

 Christopher Idle (hymnwriter) (born 1938), British hymnwriter
 Christopher Idle (politician) (1771–1819), British politician and member of Parliament